The Pesticide Recordkeeping Program (PRP), authorized by the 1990 farm bill (P.L. 101-624, Sec. 1491), requires that private pesticide applicators keep records of the pesticides they use in agricultural production and that the records be surveyed to provide a database on restricted-use pesticides.

References

External links
[www.ams.usda.gov/science/sdpr.htm].

United States Department of Agriculture programs